Junie is a given name and nickname.

Notable people with the given name include:
Junie B. Jones, fictional character in a children's series written by Barbara Park
Junie Cobb (1896–1970), American jazz multi-instrumentalist and bandleader
Junie Donlavey (born 1924), former NASCAR Sprint Cup Series car owner with a team based in Richmond
Junie Hoang (born 1971), plaintiff in Hoang v. Amazon.com, Inc. 
Junie Mitchum (born 1973), West Indies cricketer
Junie Morosi (born 1933), Australian businesswoman

Notable people with the nickname include:
Walter "Junie" Morrison (1954–2017), American funk musician
Maia Wright, Swedish singer also known as Junie

See also
Junie 5, 1981 solo album recorded by multi-instrumentalist Walter "Junie" Morrison
Tell Me That You Love Me, Junie Moon, 1970 film directed by Otto Preminger